Liepnitzsee is a German lake located in the municipalities of Wandlitz and Bernau bei Berlin, Brandenburg. At an elevation of 49.7 m, its surface area is 1.17 km².

External links 
 

Lakes of Brandenburg
Barnim